Alamitos Bay is an inlet on the Pacific Ocean coast of southern California, United States, between the cities of Long Beach and Seal Beach, at the outlet of the San Gabriel River. It is near Los Angeles.

The bay is named for the Spanish word for 'little poplars'.

Geography
Alamitos Bay is protected by both the natural sand spit Peninsula and the Long Beach Breakwater.
It is divided from the San Gabriel River and Seal Beach by a pair of jetties. The natural geography has been heavily altered by dredging and landfill subsequent to development.

The bay was severely impacted by the 1939 California tropical storm.

Venues
Alamitos Bay contains Marine Stadium, created for Olympic rowing events.

Water quality

After efforts to clear contaminated sediment and improve circulation, Heal the Bay has re-assessed the water's quality.  In a 2020 report, the "Summer Dry Grade" at the 2nd Street Bridge was "B," and at Mother's Beach "A."  "Winter Dry Grades" were "C" and "B," respectively.  "Wet Weather Grades" were both "F."

The water quality of the bay could be diminished in the future if the pumps of the nearby Alamitos Energy Center are decommissioned.  The city is assessing a replacement for these pumps to maintain the bay's water circulation.

Islands
Naples, a collection of three islands, is entirely within Alamitos Bay.

See also
 Alamitos Bay Yacht Club
 Peninsula, Long Beach, California

References 

Bays of California
Geography of Long Beach, California
Bodies of water of Los Angeles County, California